Wild Bill Davis (November 24, 1918 – August 17, 1995) was the stage name of American jazz pianist, organist, and arranger William Strethen Davis. He is best known for his pioneering jazz electric organ recordings and for his tenure with the Tympany Five, the backing group for Louis Jordan. Prior to the emergence of Jimmy Smith in 1956, Davis (whom Smith had reportedly first seen playing organ in the 1930s) was the pacesetter among organists.

Biography
Davis was born in Glasgow, Missouri and grew up in Parsons, Kansas. He first learned music from his father who was a professional singer. He received further musical training at the Tuskegee Institute (now Tuskegee University) in Alabama, and at Wiley College in Marshall, Texas. In his early career he took inspiration from Fats Waller and Art Tatum. 

Davis moved to Chicago, where he originally played guitar and wrote arrangements for Milt Larkin's big band from 1939 through 1942; a band which included Arnett Cobb, Illinois Jacquet, and Tom Archia on horns. In 1943 he played guitar and wrote arrangements for Earl Hines. Davis first worked as a pianist in Chicago with Louis Jordan and his band Tympany Five, whom he played with regularly from 1945 through 1949.  He played a crucial role as the pianist-arranger for that ensemble at the height of their success in the years 1945 through 1947. He also played piano in a recording with Buster Bennett in 1945. 

After leaving Jordan and the Tympany Five, Davis pursued a career as an solo organist in 1950. He moved to the East Coast. He also recorded again with Buster Bennett and worked with Claude McLin. In 1951 he formed the Bill Davis Trio (aka the "Wild Bill Davis Trio"), which consisted of Chris Columbus on drums and the left-handed guitarist Bill Jennings, that recorded for OKeh Records. Davis continued to lead his trio for decades, with other musicians swapping in and out periodically. The trio would always include organ and drums with either guitar or double bass. For decades his trio spent summers playing in Atlantic City, New Jersey.

Davis was originally supposed to record "April in Paris" with Count Basie's Orchestra in 1955 but when he could not make the session, Basie used his arrangement for the full band and had a major hit. Some musicians he did record with include saxophonists Frank Morgan (1955), Arnett Cobb (1959), and Johnny Hodges (1961, 1963–66); and singer Ella Fitzgerald (1963). 

In addition to working with his own group, Davis recorded and led tours with Duke Ellington from 1969 through 1971.  In the 1970s he recorded for the Black & Blue Records label in Paris, France with a variety of swing all-stars, including saxophonist and clarinetist Buddy Tate (1972); trombonist Al Grey (1972);  saxophonist and blues shouter Eddie Vinson (1972); double bass player Slam Stewart (1972), tenor saxophonist Illinois Jacquet (1973), and tenor saxophonist Eddie “Lockjaw” Davis (1976). He played with Lionel Hampton from 1978 through 1980.  The duo appeared periodically after at festivals through the early 1990s. In 1983 Davis recorded with French jazz saxophonist Guy Lafitte in 1983. In 1987 he toured with trombonist Grover Mitchell and his band. He also toured France with the ensemble '3 D'  whose other members included French vibraphonist Dany Doriz and French drummer Michel Denis. He appeared at many music festivals internationally during the 1980s and into the early 1990s. 

Davis died on August 17, 1995 in Moorestown, New Jersey.

Discography

As leader/co-leader
 1951: "Eyesight To The Blind" // "Catch 'Em Young, Treat 'Em Rough, Tell 'Em Nothing" (OKeh 4-6808)
 1951: "Chicken Gumbo" // "Hi Diddle Diddle" (OKeh 4-6836) – note: these four songs feature Bill Jennings, Chris Columbus (AKA Chris Columbo)
 1952: Azure-Te (Paris Blues) (Columbia 4-39819, sung by Frank Sinatra, composition: Bill Davis, lyrics: Donald Wolf), #30 on Billboard Hot 100 in 27 September 1952.
 1954: Here's Wild Bill Davis (Epic LG-1004 [10" LP]) – with Floyd Smith, Chris Columbus
 1954: On The Loose (Epic LN-1121 [10" LP]) – with Floyd Smith, Chris Columbus
 1955: Wild Bill Davis At Birdland (Epic LN-3118) – with Floyd Smith, Chris Columbus; reissued as Lullaby Of Birdland in 1972.
 1955: Evening Concerto (Epic LN-3308) – with Floyd Smith, Chris Columbus
 1956: Wild Bill Davis On Broadway (Imperial LP-9010) – with Floyd Smith, Joe Morris
 1956: Wild Bill Davis In Hollywood (Imperial LP-9015) – with Floyd Smith, Joe Morris
 1959: Wild Bill Davis Swings Hit Songs From "My Fair Lady" (Everest LPBR-5014/SDBR-1014) – with Maurice Simon, Milt Hinton, Jo Jones
 1959: Flying High With Wild Bill Davis (Everest LPBR-5052/SDBR-1052) – with George Clark, Bill Jennings, Grady Tate
 1960: Dance The Madison! (Everest LPBR-5094/SDBR-1094)
 1960: Organ Grinder's Swing (Everest LPBR-5116/SDBR-1116) – reissue of Dance The Madison!
 1961: Dis Heah (This Here) (Everest LPBR-5125/SDBR-1125)
 1961: The Music From Milk & Honey (Everest LPBR-5133/SDBR-1133) – with Charlie Shavers
 1961: Blue Hodge (Verve V6-8406) – with Johnny Hodges; reissued on CD in 2007 by Lone Hill Jazz (LHJ10286).
 1962: One More Time (Coral CRL-57417)
 1962: Lover (Coral CRL-57427)
 1963: Wild Wild Wild Wild Wild Wild Wild Wild Wild Wild Bill Davis (Imperial LP-9201/LP-12201)
 1963: Mess of Blues (Verve V6-8570) – with Johnny Hodges, Kenny Burrell; reissued on CD in 2007 by Lone Hill Jazz (LHJ10285).
 1964: Blue Rabbit (Verve V6-8599) – with Johnny Hodges; reissued on CD in 2007 by Lone Hill Jazz (LHJ10286).
 1965: Free, Frantic And Funky (RCA Victor LSP-3314)
 1965: Con-Soul & Sax (RCA Victor LSP-3393) – with Johnny Hodges; reissued on CD in 2007 by Lone Hill Jazz (LHJ10283).
 1965: Joe's Blues (Verve V6-8617) – with Johnny Hodges, Grant Green; reissued on CD in 2007 by Lone Hill Jazz (LHJ10284).
 1965: Wings & Things (Verve V6-8630) – with Johnny Hodges, Grant Green; reissued on CD in 2007 by Lone Hill Jazz (LHJ10284).
 1966: Blue Pyramid (Verve V6-8635) – with Johnny Hodges; reissued on CD in 2007 by Lone Hill Jazz (LHJ10283).
 1966: Live At Count Basie's (RCA Victor LSP-3578)
 1966: Wild Bill Davis & Johnny Hodges in Atlantic City (RCA Victor LSP-3706) – with Johnny Hodges; reissued as In A Mellotone in 1990; reissued on CD in 2007 by Lone Hill Jazz (LHJ10283).
 1967: Midnight to Dawn (RCA Victor LSP-3799)
 1968: Flying Home (Sunset/Liberty SUM-1191/SUS-5191) – compilation of material recorded for Everest Records.
 1969: Doin' His Thing (RCA Victor LSP-4139)
 1971: Wonderful World Of Love (Tangerine TRCS-1509)
 1972: Impulsions (Disques Black & Blue 33.037) – with Floyd Smith, Chris Columbus
 1972: Midnight Slows, Vol. 2 (Disques Black & Blue 33.045) – with Buddy Tate, Floyd Smith, Chris Columbus
 1972: Buddy Tate & Wild Bill Davis (Disques Black & Blue 33.054) – with Floyd Smith, Chris Columbus; reissued on CD as Broadway in 1987 by Black & Blue.
 1973: Illinois Jacquet With Wild Bill Davis (Disques Black & Blue 33.044) – with Al Bartee; reissued on CD as The Man I Love in 1995 by Black & Blue.
 1973: Illinois Jacquet With Wild Bill Davis, Vol. 2 (Disques Black & Blue 33.082) – with Al Bartee
 1976: Wild Bill Davis & Eddie "Lockjaw" Davis Live! (Disques Black & Blue 33.303) – with Billy Butler, Oliver Jackson
 1976: Wild Bill Davis & Eddie "Lockjaw" Davis Live! Vol. 2 (Disques Black & Blue 33.308) – with Billy Butler, Oliver Jackson
 1976: All Right OK You Win (Disques Black & Blue 33.133) – with Eddie "Lockjaw" Davis, Billy Butler, Oliver Jackson
 1986: Live At Swiss Radio, Studio Zürich (Jazz Connaisseur JCLP-8701) – with Clifford Scott, Dickie Thompson, Clyde Lucas
 1986: Greatest Organ Solos Ever! (Jazz Connaisseur JCLP-8702) – solo organ
 1987: 70th/30th Anniversary Live Concert (Die Mühle A-850581) – with Austrian jazz organist T.C. Pfeiler http://www.tcpfeiler.com
 1990: Wild Bill Davis Super Trio: That's All (Jazz Connaisseur JCCD-9005) – with Plas Johnson, Butch Miles
 2004: In the Groove! (Fresh Sound FSRCD-308) – with George Clark, Bill Jennings, Grady Tate; CD compilation of material recorded for Everest Records.
 2004: In a Mellow Tone (Fresh Sound FSRCD-309) – with George Clark, Bill Jennings, Grady Tate; CD compilation of material recorded for Everest Records.
 2005: Organology By Wild Bill Davis: April In Paris (Vol. 1) (Ocium Records [Spain] OCM-0046) – CD compilation of material recorded for Epic Records.
 2005: Organology by Wild Bill Davis: Syncopated Clock (Vol. 2) (Ocium Records [Spain] OCM-0047) – CD compilation of material recorded for Epic Records.
 2005: The Everest Years (Expanded Edition) (Empire Musicwerks/Re Records/V.I. Music 50719) – CD compilation of Davis' five Everest albums.
 2014: Live at Sonny's Place 1985 (Squatty Roo Records SQU-217)
 2014: Live at Sonny's Place 1986 (Squatty Roo Records SQU-218)
 2021: The Wild Bill Davis Collection 1951-1960 (Acrobat Records ADDCD-3373) – 2CD compilation of material recorded for the OKeh, Epic, Imperial, and Everest labels.

As sideman
With Ray Brown / Milt Jackson
 Much in Common (Verve, 1964)
With Billy Butler
 Don't Be That Way (Black & Blue, 1976)
With Arnett Cobb
 Blow Arnett, Blow (Prestige, 1959)
With Gene "Mighty Flea" Conners
 Coming Home (Black & Blue, 1976)
With Eddie "Lockjaw" Davis
 Jaws Strikes Again (Black & Blue, 1976)
With Duke Ellington
 New Orleans Suite (Atlantic, 1970)
 70th Birthday Concert (Solid State, 1970)
With Johnny Hodges
 Sandy's Gone (Verve, 1963)
With Frank Morgan
Frank Morgan (Gene Norman Presents, 1955)
With Floyd Smith
 Floyd's Guitar Blues (Black & Blue, 1972)
With Sonny Stitt
 The Matadors Meet the Bull (Roulette, 1965)
 What's New!!! (Roulette, 1966)

References

External links
 [ AllMusic]

1918 births
1995 deaths
American jazz pianists
American male pianists
American jazz organists
American male organists
Imperial Records artists
RCA Victor artists
Duke Ellington Orchestra members
Riverside Records artists
20th-century American pianists
People from Glasgow, Missouri
Jazz musicians from Missouri
American male jazz musicians
20th-century American keyboardists
Epic Records artists
Black & Blue Records artists
20th-century American male musicians